The long-billed bush warbler (Locustella major) is a species of Old World warbler in the family Locustellidae.
It is found in China, India, Pakistan, and Tajikistan. It is also known as long-billed grasshopper warbler.

It is threatened by habitat loss.

References

long-billed bush warbler
Birds of Western China
Birds of North India
long-billed bush warbler
Taxonomy articles created by Polbot